The 1898 New Jersey gubernatorial election was held on November 8, 1898. Republican nominee Foster McGowan Voorhees defeated Democratic nominee Elvin W. Crane with 48.91% of the vote.

General election

Candidates
Elvin W. Crane, Essex County Prosecutor (Democratic)
Thomas H. Landon (Prohibition)
Matthew Maguire, machinist and nominee for Vice President of the United States in 1896 (Socialist Labor)
Frederick Schrayshuen (Populist)
Foster McGowan Voorhees, State Senator for Union County (Republican)

Results

References

1898
New Jersey
Gubernatorial
November 1898 events